1st parallel may refer to:

1st parallel north, a circle of latitude in the Northern Hemisphere
1st parallel south, a circle of latitude in the Southern Hemisphere